Shane C. Drake is an American music video director and producer originally from Redding, California. He has directed videos for many artists, including Kelly Clarkson, Carrie Underwood, Avril Lavigne, Trivium, Paramore, Fall Out Boy, Panic! at the Disco, Angels & Airwaves, Flo Rida, Timbaland, Blindside, The Red Jumpsuit Apparatus, The Almost, Hawthorne Heights, Subseven, and AJR. He is best known for Panic! At the Disco: I Write Sins Not Tragedies (2006), Tim McGraw & Taylor Swift: Highway Don't Care (2013) and Paramore: Misery Business (2007).

Early career
Early in his career, Drake spent time working as an editor and cinematographer with such bands as Poison the Well, Deftones, Thursday and many more. He now spends most of his time directing. Drake has directed videos for some of todays biggest acts. He owns Say So Pictures, a California-based production company.

Awards
In 2006 Drake was awarded the MTV Video Music Award for Video of the Year for Panic! at the Disco's "I Write Sins Not Tragedies".

In 2007 Drake was nominated for the MTV Monster Single of the Year for his video for Timbaland's "The Way I Are". In 2008, he was nominated for MTV Video Music Award for Best Direction and MTV Video Music Award for Best Pop Video with Panic! at the Disco's "Nine in the Afternoon" and MTV Video Music Award for Best Rock Video with Paramore's "Crushcrushcrush" and also Fall Out Boy's cover of "Beat It".  In 2009 Drake was nominated for the MTV Video Music Award for Best Rock Video for his video for Paramore's "Decode" from the Twilight film soundtrack album. In 2012, he was nominated for MTV Video Music Award for Best Video with a Message for Kelly Clarkson's "Dark Side".

At the 48th Academy of Country Music Awards Drake took home music video of the year for the Little Big Town song "Tornado" starring Johnathon Schaech.

In 2013 the "Highway Don't Care" film won Drake, Tim McGraw, Taylor Swift and Keith Urban the Country Music Association Award for Video of the Year.

Drake would go on to win two CMT awards in the coming years, one in 2015 for the Lady A music video for their song, "Bartender" starring Tony Hale and Kate Upton, the other in 2019 for the Carrie Underwood music video for her song "Love Wins".

Music videography

Awards and honors

References

External links

 Say So Pictures - Shane Drake Official Website
 mvdbase.com - Shane C. Drake Videography
 I Write Sins Not Tragedies page at MTV Video Music Awards site.
 IMDB - Shane Drake Official IMDB Page

American music video directors
Living people
1974 births
People from Redding, California